The 2017 Cairo Declaration (also known as SPLM Declaration of Unification) was signed on November 16, 2017, at the Egyptian General Intelligence's headquarters in Cairo, Egypt.

Overview 
The document was an attempt with the aim to unite and end the SPLM civil war in South Sudan, including the return of refugees and displaced persons to their areas of origin.

Declaration 
The declaration was signed on 16 November 2017 at the end of 3-days meetings in Cairo.

Measures 

Start the process 2015 Arusha reunification agreement
The SPLM will no longer recognize Riek Machar as the leader of the SPLM-IO faction, but will have an opportunity to join the IGAD-led reunification process.

Signatories and attendees 
President Abdel Fatah al-Sisi of Egypt, President Yoweri Kaguta Museveni of Uganda were present.

The document was signed by:

President of Egypt and Egyptian representative Abdel Fatah al-Sisi 
President of Uganda and Ugandan representative Yoweri Kaguta Museveni
Defence Minister of South Sudan and South Sudanese SPLM-IG representative Kuol Manyang
Leader of Former Detainees and South Sudanese SPLM-FDS representative Pagan Amum Okiech
First Vice President of South Sudan and South Sudanese SPLM-IO representative Taban Deng Gai

International Reactions 

  - Former First Vice President and Leader of SPLM-In Opposition, Riek Machar: Denounced the SPLM reunification agreement signed in Cairo and called to end his confinement in South Africa.
  - Yemeni Ambassador, Mohammed Ali Maram: Praised the vital role played by Egypt in settling the South Sudan bloody conflicts that led to many deaths and left others internally and externally displaced.

References

2017 in Egypt
2017 in international relations
Peace treaties
South Sudanese Civil War